The 1952 European Judo Championships were the 2nd edition of the European Judo Championships, and were held in Paris, France, from 9 to 12 December 1952.

Medal winners

References

External links
 

European Judo Championships
European Judo Championships
Europe
Sport in Paris
International sports competitions hosted by France
E